The 1894 Lafayette football team was an American football team that represented Lafayette College as an independent during the 1894 college football season. In its first season under head coach Hugh Janeway, the team compiled a 5–6 record. Samuel Jordan was the team captain. The team played its home games at March Field in Easton, Pennsylvania.

Schedule

References

Lafayette
Lafayette Leopards football seasons
Lafayette football